Ulseth is a surname. Notable people with the surname include:

 Otto Ulseth (born 1957), Norwegian football coach and journalist
 Steve Ulseth (born 1959), American ice hockey player